An educational institution is a place where people of different ages gain an education, including preschools, childcare, primary-elementary schools, secondary-high schools, and universities.  They provide a large variety of learning environments and learning spaces.

Types of educational institution
Types of educational institution include:

Early childhood
 Infant school
 Kindergarten
 Preschool or nursery

Primary
 Comprehensive school
 Elementary, grade or primary school
 Junior school
 Middle school (partly)
 Preparatory school (United Kingdom)

Secondary
 Academy (English school)
 Adult high school
 Boarding school
 Collegiate institute
 Comprehensive school
 Comprehensive school (England and Wales)
 Grammar school
 Gymnasium (school)
 
 Independent school (UK)
 Middle school (partly)
 Military high school
 Minor seminary
 Realschule
 Secondary school or high school
 Staff college
 Studio school
 University technical college
 University-preparatory school
 Upper school

Further and higher education
 Academy
 Career college
 College
 Community college
 Corporate university
 Folk high school
 Graduate school
 Gurukula
 International university
 Jamiah
 Junior college
 Liberal arts college
 Local university
 Madrasah
 Maths school
 Medieval university
 Military academy
 
 Private university
 Public university
 Research university
 Residential college
 Seminary
 Sixth form college
 Technical college or institute of technology
 Technical school
 University
 University college
 Upper division college
 Vocational university
 Yeshiva

Other 

 All-through school
 Alternative school
 Charter school
 Community school
 International school
 Laboratory school
 Language school
 Lyceum
 Magnet school
 Montessori school
 Music school
 One-room school
 Online school
 Private school
 Religious school
 Selective school
 Specialist school
 State school
 Sudbury school
 Waldorf school

See also

 Lists of schools
 Lists of universities and colleges

References